Aleksander Graybner was the President of Warsaw from 1837 to 1839 November 1847.

References

Mayors of Warsaw
Government officials of Congress Poland
Year of birth missing
Year of death missing